Robert Lyman "Dink" Templeton (May 27, 1897 – August 7, 1962) was an American track and field athlete, Olympic gold medalist in rugby union, college football player, and track coach.

Personal 
Templeton was born in Helena, Montana, and attended Palo Alto High School in Palo Alto, California. He attended Stanford University, where he played on the football and rugby union teams. He received both his undergraduate and law degrees from Stanford.

Olympics 
In 1920, Templeton was on the United States Olympic team in rugby and the long jump. He was handicapped in his best event, the high jump, because he normally used the Western roll jumping style, which was considered illegal at that time. In the long jump, he finished out of the medals in fourth place, but the U.S. rugby team upset France to win the gold medal.

Track coach 
In 1922, Templeton returned to Stanford as its track coach, a position he held until 1939. During his tenure as coach, Stanford won the NCAA Men's Outdoor Track and Field Championship in 1925, 1928, and 1934, and Stanford athletes won 19 individual titles. He was noted at the time for conducting intensive daily practices, an uncommon practice at that time. He later coached at the Olympic Club in San Francisco.

Later life 
Templeton also had a career as a journalist and broadcaster. For his coaching, he was inducted into the USA Track & Field Hall of Fame in 1976, and is a member of the Stanford Athletic Hall of Fame in recognition of his coaching and as a football player.

References

External links
 
 
 

1897 births
1962 deaths
American football fullbacks
American male high jumpers
American male long jumpers
American rugby union players
Athletes (track and field) at the 1920 Summer Olympics
Olympic rugby union players of the United States
Olympic gold medalists for the United States in track and field
Rugby union players at the 1920 Summer Olympics
Stanford Cardinal track and field coaches
Stanford Cardinal football players
Stanford Cardinal men's track and field athletes
United States international rugby union players
Sportspeople from Helena, Montana
Sportspeople from Palo Alto, California
Players of American football from California
Medalists at the 1920 Summer Olympics
Rugby union fullbacks